Ludwig Strecker Jr., also Ludwig Strecker der Jüngere, (13 January 188315 September 1978) was a German music publisher, and an author of opera librettos which he wrote under the pen name Ludwig Andersen. He authored, and published through the Schott publishing house, two of the most successful German contemporary operas of the 1930s, Egk's Die Zaubergeige and Reutter's  Doktor Johannes Faust.

Life 
Born Ludwig Emanuel Strecker in Mainz, he was interested in poetry and literature early in life. He studied law at the Ludwig-Maximilians-Universität München, the Humboldt-Universität zu Berlin and the University of Leipzig, where he obtained his doctorate in 1906.

Strecker and his brother Wilhelm Strecker became directors in 1920, and opened the publishing house for contemporary composers such as Paul Hindemith and Carl Orff. They took over the management of Schott together when their father died in 1943.

Under the pseudonym Ludwig Andersen, he also worked as a librettist and translator of libretti. Among the libretti he wrote for notable composers of the period, and then published, were Werner Egk's Die Zaubergeige, premiered in 1935 by the Oper Frankfurt, and Hermann Reutter's  Doktor Johannes Faust, premiered also in Frankfurt in 1936; the two works were among the most successful German contemporary operas during the Nazi regime, Die Zaubergeige being performed 198 times and Doktor Johannes Faust 116 times in Germany until 1945. This success established Schott as a leading publisher of stage works. Strecker translated Ermanno Wolf-Ferrari's opera Gli dei a Tebe for its world premiere at the Staatsoper Hannover in 1943.

Strecker's first wife was Friedel Preetorius (1884-1938), the daughter of the Mainz entrepreneur and politician . Strecker died in Wiesbaden at age 95.

Awards 
 1953: Order of Merit of the Federal Republic of Germany
 1955:  of Rheinland-Pfalz
 Honorary senator of the Johannes Gutenberg University Mainz

Librettos 
 . Music: Hermann Reutter. Premiere 1933, revised version 1970 Stuttgart.
 Die Zaubergeige. Music: Werner Egk. Premiere 1935 Oper Frankfurt.
 Doktor Johannes Faust. Music: Reutter. Premiere 1936 Oper Frankfurt, revised version 1955 Stuttgart
 . Music: Joseph Haas. Premiere 1937 Kassel.
 . Music: Haas. Premiere 1944 Dresden.
 . Music: Cesar Bresgen. Premiere 1948 Esslingen, revised version 1951 Staatstheater Nürnberg.

Literature

References

External links 
 Strecker, Ludwig on BMLO
 
 

German music publishers (people)
German librettists
Knights Commander of the Order of Merit of the Federal Republic of Germany
1883 births
1978 deaths
Writers from Mainz
Businesspeople from Mainz